Air Tomisko was a cargo airline based in Belgrade, Serbia.

It was founded in 2006 and its owner was Tomislav Damnjanović who had previously worked at JAT Yugoslav Airlines and was director at Kosmas Air.  The fleet consisted of 3 Ilyushin Il-76.  The company lost its licence in 2007.

References

Defunct cargo airlines
Defunct airlines of Serbia
Airlines established in 2006
Airlines disestablished in 2007
Cargo airlines of Serbia
Serbian companies established in 2006